Matthew 11 is the eleventh chapter in the Gospel of Matthew in the New Testament section of the Christian Bible. It continues the narrative about Jesus' ministry in Galilee.

Text
The original text was written in Koine Greek. This chapter is divided into 30 verses.

Textual witnesses
Some early manuscripts containing the text of this chapter are:
Papyrus 70 (3rd century; extant verses 26-27)
Codex Vaticanus (325-350)
Codex Sinaiticus (330-360; complete)
Papyrus 62 (4th century; extant verses 25-30; also contains verses 25-29 in the Coptic language)
Papyrus 19 (4th/5th century; extant verses 1–5)
Codex Bezae (~400)
Codex Washingtonianus (~400)
Codex Ephraemi Rescriptus (~450; complete)
Codex Purpureus Rossanensis (6th century)
Codex Petropolitanus Purpureus (6th century; extant verses 4-30)
Codex Sinopensis (6th century; extant verses 5-12)

Structure 
This chapter can be grouped (with cross references to the other gospels):
 Matthew 11:1 = Ministry of Jesus (continuation of Matthew 10:34-42)
 Matthew 11:2-19 = Messengers from John the Baptist
 Matthew 11:20–24 = Cursing Chorazin, Bethsaida, and Capernaum
 Matthew 11:25–30 = Praising the Father

The New King James Version organises this chapter as follows:
 = John the Baptist Sends Messengers to Jesus
 = Woe to the Impenitent Cities
 = Jesus gives True Rest

John the Baptist sent messengers to Jesus
Verses 2 to 6 relate to John the Baptist's enquiry about Jesus, relayed by his messengers. Verses 7 to 19 recount Jesus' assessment of John's ministry.

Verses 2–3
Now when John had heard in the prison the works of Christ, he sent two of his disciples,
And said unto him, Art thou he that should come, or do we look for another?

Verses 20-24

Having set out in verse 1 "to teach and to preach in their cities", verses 20-24 give an account of Jesus' condemnation of the cities of Galilee for their refusal to repent. Jesus worked most of his miracles or "deeds of power" in these cities.

Verse 25
At that time, Jesus answered and said, “I thank You, Father, Lord of heaven and earth, that You have hidden these things from the wise and prudent and have revealed them to babes.
German Protestant theologian Karl Theodor Keim called this text a "pearl of the sayings of Jesus". Pope Francis has noted with support that Pope Benedict XVI "often pointed out that the theologian must remain attentive to the faith lived by the humble and the small, to whom it pleased the Father to reveal that which He had hidden from the learned and the wise”.

Verse 27
All things have been delivered to Me by My Father, and no one knows the Son except the Father. Nor does anyone know the Father except the Son, and the one to whom the Son wills to reveal Him.
The Jerusalem Bible suggests that this verse has "a Johannine flavour", observing that "awareness of Christ's divine sonship exists in the deepest stratum of the synoptic tradition as well as in [John]."

Verse 28
Come unto me, all ye that labour and are heavy laden,
 and I will give you rest.

Old manuscripts

Papyrus 62 (4th century)

Uses

Music
The King James Version of verses 28–30 from this chapter are cited as texts in the English-language oratorio "Messiah" by George Frideric Handel (HWV 56).

See also 
 John the Baptist
 Weddings and Funerals
 Related Bible parts: Matthew 10, Mark 13, Luke 7, Luke 10, Luke 12, Luke 21

References

External links 
 
 King James Bible - Wikisource
English Translation with Parallel Latin Vulgate
Online Bible at GospelHall.org (ESV, KJV, Darby, American Standard Version, Bible in Basic English)
Multiple bible versions at Bible Gateway (NKJV, NIV, NRSV etc.)

 
Gospel of Matthew chapters
Bethsaida
Phoenicians in the New Testament
Chorazin
Capernaum